9th Infantry Regiment can refer to:

 9th Infantry Regiment "Bari"
 Infantry Regiment "Soria" No. 9
 9th Infantry Regiment (United States)